Rajkumar Chahar is an Indian politician. He was elected to the Lok Sabha, lower house of the Parliament of India from Fatehpur Sikri, Uttar Pradesh in the 2019 Indian general election as member of the Bharatiya Janata Party.

References

External links
Official biographical sketch in Parliament of India website

India MPs 2019–present
Lok Sabha members from Uttar Pradesh
Living people
Bharatiya Janata Party politicians from Uttar Pradesh
People from Agra district
1967 births